The Ministry of the Presidency is the department of the Government of Bolivia that provides support to the presidential administration by coordinating its political-administrative actions with the different ministries as well as the legislative, judicial, and electoral branches of government in addition to social sectors and cooperatives. Aside from these tasks, the ministry acts as the chief custodian of the government, filing all laws, decrees, and resolutions and publishing them in the Official Gazette of Bolivia.

Established on 6 August 1989 by Presidential Decree N° 22292 issued by President Jaime Paz Zamora, the office was previously known as the General Secretariat of the Presidency. The first official under the newly elevated ministry was Gustavo Fernández Saavedra, appointed on the same day.

Administration 
María Nela Prada is the incumbent minister, appointed on 9 November 2020. The minister is charged with the appointment of four vice ministers. The current incumbents are: Freddy Bobaryn, Juan Villca, Álvaro Ruiz García, and Gabriela Alcón.

Organization 

Ministry of the Presidency
Advice and Administrative Support
 General Directorate of Planning
 General Directorate of Administrative Affairs
 Financial Unit
 Technologies Information and Communication Unit
 Administrative Unit
 Administrative Management Support Unit
 Human Resources Unit
 General Directorate of Legal Affairs
 General Archive and Institutional Memory Unit
 Legal Management Unit
 Legal Analysis Unit
 Agrarian Advisory Unit
 Chief of Staff of the Minister
 Social Communication Unit
 Social Management Support Unit
 Internal Audit Unit
 Transparency and Fight against Corruption Unit
 Property Management Unit
 Substantive Level
 Vice Ministry of Coordination and Government Management
 General Directorate of Plurinational Legislative Management
 Constitutional Analysis Unit
 Management and Parliamentary monitoring Unit
 General Directorate of Plurinational Public Management
 Public Management Unit
 Vice Ministry of Coordination with Social Movements and Civil Society
 General Directorate of Coordination with Movements Social and Civil Society
 Social Demand Management Unit
 Monitoring and National Analysis Unit
 Strengthening Social Organizations Unit
 Support for Social Public Policy Technical Unit
 Vice Ministry of Autonomies
 General Directorate of Autonomies
 Departmental and Municipal Autonomies Unit
 Urban Areas and Metropolization Unit
 General Directorate of Territorial Organization
 Regional and Indigenous Autonomies Unit
 Limits and Territorial Organization Unit
 Vice Ministry of Communication
 General Directorate of Communicational Policies
 Studies and Projects Unit
 Social Networking Unit
 Communicational Strategies Unit
 Governmental Information Unit
 General Directorate of Communicational Management
 State Media Unit
 Information and State Documentation and Newspaper Library
 Bolivia Newspaper
 Radio Illimani - New Homeland Network
 Bolivian National Agency (ABI)
 Radios of the Indigenous towns
 Districts Unit
 ENTB in Settlement
 Presidential Communication Unit
 Deconcentrated Units
 Official Gazette of Bolivia
 Analysis Unit
 National Fund for Solidarity and Equity Executive Unit
 Special Projects Unit (UPRE)
 Decentralized Units
 Technical Office for Strengthening the Public Enterprise (OFEP)
 Electronic Government and Information and Communication Technologies Agency (AGETIC)
 State Autonomy Service (SEA)
 Strategic Companies
 Bolivia TV
 Editorial of the Plurinational State of Bolivia

Source:

See also 

 Cabinet of Bolivia

External links 

 Official website
 Official Gazette of Bolivia

References 

1989 establishments in Bolivia
Ministries established in 1989